Leonard Hugo "Leo" Wery (March 27, 1926 – August 29, 2019) was a Dutch field hockey player who competed in the 1952 Summer Olympics. He was a member of the Dutch field hockey team, which won the silver medal. He played all three matches as forward. After the end of his professional hockey career, Wery had a career at the Royal Dutch/Shell Oil Company as a lawyer. He was born in The Hague.

References
Leonard Wery's obituary

External links
 
Leonard Wery's profile at databaseOlympics

1926 births
2019 deaths
Dutch male field hockey players
Field hockey players at the 1952 Summer Olympics
Olympic field hockey players of the Netherlands
Olympic medalists in field hockey
Olympic silver medalists for the Netherlands
Field hockey players from The Hague
Medalists at the 1952 Summer Olympics